Kate Daniels (born July 2, 1953 in Richmond, Virginia) is an American poet.

Life
Kate Daniels was born in Richmond, Virginia. She was educated at the University of Virginia (B.A. and M.A. in English Literature) and Columbia University (M.F.A. School of the Arts). Her teaching career has taken her to the University of Virginia; the University of Massachusetts Amherst; Louisiana State University; Wake Forest University; Bennington College; and Vanderbilt University.

Kate Daniels resides in Nashville, Tennessee, where she is the Edwin Mims Professor of English and Director of Creative Writing at Vanderbilt University. She has served as Poet in Residence at both Duke University Medical Center and Vanderbilt University Medical Center, and has been a visiting scholar at the Center for Biomedical Ethics and the Humanities at the University of Virginia. She is also on the writing faculty of the Baltimore Washington Center for Psychoanalysis, and has presented on the intersections of psychoanalysis and poetry at several training institutes. In Nashville, and other communities, she pursues her interest in using creative writing as an aspect of treatment for and recovery from drug addiction by teaching workshops on Writing for Recovery.

Themes

Daniels' poetry consistently explores aspects of gender-based and Southern working class experience, and has been described as "distinct in the general history of southern poetry in its devotion to recovering the urban, working-class South, presenting a vision of the literal and cultural poverty" of such lives." She also explores addiction as a family illness.

Publications

Her first book of poetry, The White Wave (University of Pittsburgh Press, 1984), won the Agnes Lynch Starrett Poetry Prize. Her second volume, The Niobe Poems (University of Pittsburgh, 1988), received honorable mention for the Paterson Poetry Prize. Four Testimonies, her third volume, was selected by Dave Smith for his imprint Southern Messenger Series, published by LSU Press (1998). A fourth volume, A Walk in Victoria's Secret, was published in 2011 in the same series. Two new volumes -- Three Syllables Describing Addiction and In the Months of My Son's Recovery—are forthcoming in 2018 and 2019.

Daniels received the 2011 Hanes Award from Poetry by the Fellowship of Southern Writers, and was elected to the membership of the Fellowship of Southern Writers in 2015. She was a Guggenheim Fellow in Poetry 2013–14.

Her poems have appeared in numerous journals and magazines, and have been the recipient of awards including the Best American Poetry 2010, edited by Amy Gerstler; the Best American Poetry 2008, edited by Charles Wright; the Crazyhorse Prize for Poetry; a Pushcart Prize, the Louisiana Literature Poetry Prize, and the James Dickey Prize from Five Points: A Journal of Literature and Art. In 2003, she served as a judge for the National Book Award in Poetry.  She has participated in the Lannan Poetry Foundation's Readings & Conversations programs, interviewing Philip Levine and Tony Hoagland.

Awards
 Guggenheim Fellowship for Poetry, 2013–14
 Hanes Award for Poetry, Fellowship of Southern Writers, 2011
 Library of Virginia Prize for Poetry, Honorable Mention, 2011
 Lannan Foundation Writers Residency Fellowship, 2009 Lannan Foundation
 Best American Poetry of 2010
 Best American Poetry of 2008
 Pushcart Prize
 Crazyhorse Prize for Poetry
 Louisiana Literature Poetry Prize
 James Dickey Prize
 Agnes Lynch Starrett Poetry Prize
 Bunting Fellowship, Harvard University

Works

Poetry
 In the Months of My Son's Recovery. Louisiana State University Press, 2019. 
  Three Syllables Describing Addiction. Bull City Press, 2018.

Prose
 Kate Daniels & Richard Jones, editors (1982).  Beacon Press.  .

References

 Daniel Cross Turner. "New Fugitives: Contemporary Poets of Countermemory and the Futures of Southern Poetry." The Mississippi Quarterly: The Journal of Southern Cultures. Special Issue on Southern Poetry. 58: 1-2 (Winter-Spring 2004-2005): 315–345.
 A Conversation:  Mark Jarman and Kate Daniels," Atlanta Review (Volume VII, Number 1, Fall-Winter 2000),  pp. 14-25.
 "Biographies and Moderation: Dialogue with Kate Daniels and Philip Levine," interviewed by Craig Watson.  Vanderbilt Review (Volume XI, 1995),  pp. 121–144.

External links
 
 "The Curious Power of Poetry," in Shining Rock Poetry Anthology (Winter/Spring 2018).  http://www.shiningrockpoetry.com/a-retrospective-essay-by-kate-daniels/  
 "The Inward Journey: Review of Voyage of the Sable Venus, by Robin Coste Lewis," in Women's Review of Books (March–April 2017), pages 24–25. https://www.wcwonline.org/WRB-Issues/womens-review-of-books-2017
 "Reconsidering My Whole Position: On Robert Penn Warren" Chapter 16 (June 10, 2016) http://chapter16.org/ 
 "Phil Levine & the Burger Bitch," Best American Poetry (March 4, 2015). http://blog.bestamericanpoetry.com/the_best_american_poetry/2015/03/phil-levine-the-burger-bitch-by-kate-daniels.html
 "Remembering Philip Levine, Former Poet Laureate," The Conversation (February 24, 2015).  Accessible at: https://theconversation.com/remembering-former-poet-laureate-philip-levine-37740
 "From a Once Young Feminist: Remembering Adrienne Rich," in Women's Review of Books (July/August 2012).   http://www.wcwonline.org/Women-s-Review-of-Books-July/Aug-2012/from-a-once-young-feminist-remembering-adrienne-rich
 "Three Birthday Boys and a Transit of Venus," from Best American Poetry Blog, Guest Blogger June 4–10, 2012.  http://blog.bestamericanpoetry.com/the_best_american_poetry/2012/06/three-birthday-boys-and-a-transit-of-venus-by-kate-daniels.html
 "Interview with Kate Daniels," interviewed by Charlotte Pence.  Chapter 16 (November 15, 2010). http://www.chapter16.org/content/writing-world
  Southern Literary Review: http://southernlitreview.com/authors/who-influenced-award-winning-poet-kate-daniels.htm
  Encyclopedia Virginia:  http://www.encyclopediavirginia.org/Daniels_Kate_1953-
  Vanderbilt University:  https://web.archive.org/web/20101016020100/http://sitemason.vanderbilt.edu/site/jo89KU
 Kate Daniels' "The Pedicure" in Blackbird: an online journal of literature and the arts
 Cortland Review (winter 2009).  http://www.cortlandreview.com/features/09/winter/daniels.htm
 "Original & Unorthodox: Ten Religious Poems Worth Knowing," http://www.poetryfoundation.org/journal/article.html?id=178954
 "Interview of Tony Hoagland", Lannan podcast
 Image Artist of the Month.  http://imagejournal.org/page/artist-of-the-month/kate-daniels
 "Kate Daniels", Penn Sound

1953 births
Living people
Agnes Lynch Starrett Poetry Prize winners
University of Virginia alumni
Columbia University School of the Arts alumni
Wake Forest University faculty
Bennington College faculty
Vanderbilt University faculty
American women poets
American women academics